Floyd Millard Riddick (July 13, 1908 – January 25, 2000) was a Parliamentarian of the United States Senate from 1964 to 1974, and is most famous for developing Riddick's Senate procedure. He sat immediately below the presiding officer in the Senate chamber, providing information on precedents and advising other senators on parliamentary procedure. He is famous for discussions of the censures of Joseph McCarthy and Thomas Dodd, the contested election between John A. Durkin and Louis Wyman, and the preparations for a planned impeachment trial of Richard Nixon. He is also famous for advocating the change in the rules of cloture.

Early life

Floyd M. Riddick was born in Trotville, North Carolina in an agrarian area. His father was a farmer and merchant who did not finish primary school. Floyd Riddick's ancestor, Lemuel Riddick, was one of the signers of the Stamp Act passed by the House of Burgesses of Virginia. Riddick's family lived in a village, Gatesville, North Carolina. After his father became ill, in 1928, Riddick moved to Suffolk, Virginia. After finishing high school, Floyd M. Riddick attended Duke University and received the Bachelor of Arts degree. He was originally majoring in pre-law but then switched his major to political science after a talk with an influential professor, Robert Rankin. He then received a master's degree at Vanderbilt University in 1932, and returned to Duke to receive his Ph.D. in political science in 1935. While researching his doctoral dissertation, he spent a year observing the workings of the United States House of Representatives, a study which he eventually expanded and published as Congressional Procedure in 1941.

Career and death

After moving to Washington, D.C., he first worked as a statistical analyst for the FERA, and then for the Resettlement Administration. He then continued his congressional research interests, as an instructor of political science at American University from 1936 to 1939. He then received a position as an editor of the Congressional Daily for Congressional Intelligence, Inc., from 1939 to 1943. From 1943 to 1947, he edited the  Legislative Daily for the U.S. Chamber of Commerce. He was then invited to establish a "Daily Digest," in the Congressional Record. From 1947 to 1951, he was Senate editor of "Daily Digest", a synopsis of Congressional events which continues as a handy guide to the daily Record. He then joined the office of the parliamentarian, where he worked for 24 years. His work has appeared in the American Political Science Review and Western Political Quarterly. From 1951 to 1964, Riddick served as the Assistant Senate Parliamentarian. Floyd M. Riddick succeeded Charles L. Watkins as the Senate Parliamentarian in 1964, and held that position until 1974. As parliamentarian emeritus, he remained as a consultant to the United States Senate Committee on Rules and Administration. Floyd M. Riddick died in Santa Fe, New Mexico at age 91, on January 25, 2000.

Bibliography

Riddick's Rules of Procedure: A Modern Guide to Faster and More Efficient Meetings (1991)
Robert's Rules of Order (1986) [one of the revisors]
Senate Procedure (1958,1964,1974)
Congressional Procedure (1941)

References
U.S. Senate: Art & History Home > Oral History > Floyd M. Riddick
Relative to the death of Dr. Floyd M. Riddick, Parliamentarian Emeritus of the United States Senate. (Agreed to by Senate)
Sigma Xi Today. May/June 2000. Volume 9, Number 3.

1908 births
2000 deaths
American political scientists
American University faculty and staff
Duke University Trinity College of Arts and Sciences alumni
Employees of the United States Senate
Parliamentarians of the United States Senate
People from Gates County, North Carolina
People from Gatesville, North Carolina
Vanderbilt University alumni
20th-century political scientists